Ashes to Ashes is a British science fiction/police procedural drama television series, serving as a spin-off from the original series, Life on Mars.

The transmission dates given below refer to the original UK broadcast on BBC One.

Series overview

Episodes

Series 1 (2008)
In the first episode, Detective Inspector Alex Drake (Keeley Hawes), a 21st-century police officer,   is investigating the notes written by Sam Tyler (John Simm).  While doing this, Drake is shot and awakes in 1981, where she meets Gene Hunt (Philip Glenister), Ray Carling (Dean Andrews) and Chris Skelton (Marshall Lancaster) whom she has read about in Tyler's notes.

Series 2 (2009)
The second series was confirmed to be in production in early 2008.  This series takes place in 1982, and is the fourth British series overall in the Life On Mars franchise.

Series 3 (2010)
Series 3 consists of eight 60-minute episodes. The first episode of the series aired on 2 April 2010. Episodes 7 and 8 were joined as the show's first "two-parter" (i.e. the two episodes form one direct narrative) and was advertised as such.

References

Episodes, Ashes to Ashes
Lists of British crime television series episodes
Lists of British science fiction television series episodes